Uplift Heights Preparatory is a charter school that is located in West Dallas. Uplift Heights serves PK-12. Uplift Heights is part of Uplift Education's Network of Charter Schools.

Uplift Heights is an International Baccalaureate school.

Uplift Heights had its first graduating class in 2017.

References

External links

Private schools in Dallas

2011 establishments in Texas
Educational institutions established in 2011
High schools in Dallas
Middle schools in Dallas
Elementary schools in Dallas